Alexander 'Álex' Goikoetxea Urkiaga (born 8 March 1983 in Artea, Biscay) is a Spanish former footballer who played as a central defender.

Honours
Spain U17
Meridian Cup: 2001

Spain U20
FIFA U-20 World Cup: Runner-up 2003

External links

1983 births
Living people
People from Greater Bilbao
Spanish footballers
Footballers from the Basque Country (autonomous community)
Association football defenders
Segunda División players
Segunda División B players
Tercera División players
CD Basconia footballers
Bilbao Athletic footballers
Cultural Leonesa footballers
UD Salamanca players
Granada CF footballers
Cádiz CF players
Racing de Santander players
SD Amorebieta footballers
SD Leioa players
Spain youth international footballers
Sportspeople from Biscay
Athletic Bilbao footballers